The following outline is provided as an overview of and topical guide to Croatia:

Croatia – unitary democratic parliamentary republic in Europe at the crossroads of Central Europe, the Balkans, and the Mediterranean.  The country's population is 4 million, most of whom are Croats, with the most common religious denomination being Roman Catholicism.  Croatia is a member of the European Union (since July 2013).

General reference

 Pronunciation: 
 Common English country name: Croatia
 Official English country name: The Republic of Croatia
 Common endonym: Hrvatska
 Official endonym: Republika Hrvatska
 Adjectival(s): Croatian
 Demonym(s): Croat
 Etymology: Name of Croatia
 International rankings of Croatia
 ISO country codes: HR, HRV, 191
 ISO region codes: See ISO 3166-2:HR
 Internet country code top-level domain: .hr

 Geography of Croatia 
Geography of Croatia
 Croatia is: a country
 Location:
 Eastern Hemisphere
 Northern Hemisphere
 Eurasia
 Europe
 Southern Europe
 Balkans (also known as "Southeast Europe")
 Central Europe
 Time zone:  Central European Time (UTC+01), Central European Summer Time (UTC+02)
 Extreme points of Croatia
 High:  Dinara 
 Low:  Adriatic Sea 0 m
 Land boundaries:  1,982 km
 932 km
 455 km
 329 km
 241 km
 25 km
 Coastline:  Adriatic Sea 5,835 km
 Population of Croatia: 4,453,500

 Area of Croatia: 
 Atlas of Croatia

Environment of Croatia 

 Climate of Croatia
 Renewable energy in Croatia
 Geology of Croatia
 Protected areas of Croatia
 Biosphere reserves in Croatia
 National parks of Croatia
 Wildlife of Croatia
 Fauna of Croatia
 Birds of Croatia
 Mammals of Croatia

Natural geographic features of Croatia 

 Islands of Croatia
Inhabited islands of Croatia
 Lakes of Croatia
 Mountains of Croatia
 Rivers of Croatia
 World Heritage Sites in Croatia

Regions of Croatia 

Regions of Croatia
 Central Croatia
 Dalmatia
 Istria
 Gorski Kotar
 Međimurje
 Slavonia
 Zagorje

Administrative divisions of Croatia 

Administrative divisions of Croatia
 First level:
 Counties of Croatia
 City of Zagreb
 Second level:
 Municipalities of Croatia
 Cities of Croatia

List of counties of Croatia 

Counties of Croatia
 Bjelovar-Bilogora County
 Brod-Posavina County
 Dubrovnik-Neretva County
 Istria County
 Karlovac County
 Koprivnica-Križevci County
 Krapina-Zagorje County
 Lika-Senj County
 Međimurje County
 Osijek-Baranja County
 Požega-Slavonia County
 Primorje-Gorski Kotar County
 Sisak-Moslavina County
 Split-Dalmatia County
 Šibenik-Knin County
 Varaždin County
 Virovitica-Podravina County
 Vukovar-Syrmia County
 Zadar County
 Zagreb County
 City of Zagreb

Municipalities of Croatia 

Municipalities of Croatia
 Cities of Croatia

Demography of Croatia 

Demographics of Croatia
Croats

Government and politics of Croatia 

Politics of Croatia
 Form of government: parliamentary representative democratic republic
 Capital of Croatia: Zagreb
 Elections in Croatia
 2016 parliamentary elections
 2014–15 presidential elections
 2019–20 presidential elections
 Political parties in Croatia

Branches of government

Executive branch of the government of Croatia 
 Head of state: President of Croatia, Zoran Milanović (2020–)
 Head of government: Prime Minister of Croatia, Andrej Plenković (2016–)
 Croatian Government

Legislative branch of the government of Croatia 

 Croatian Parliament (unicameral)

Judicial branch of the government of Croatia 

Court system of Croatia
 Constitutional Court of the Republic of Croatia
 Supreme Court of the Republic of Croatia

Foreign relations of Croatia 

Foreign relations of Croatia
 Diplomatic missions in Croatia
 Diplomatic missions of Croatia

International organization membership 
The Republic of Croatia is a member of.

Australia Group
Bank for International Settlements (BIS)
Black Sea Economic Cooperation Zone (BSEC) (observer)
Central European Initiative (CEI)
Council of Europe (CE)
European Union (EU)
Euro-Atlantic Partnership Council (EAPC)
European Bank for Reconstruction and Development (EBRD)
Food and Agriculture Organization (FAO)
Inter-American Development Bank (IADB)
International Atomic Energy Agency (IAEA)
International Bank for Reconstruction and Development (IBRD)
International Chamber of Commerce (ICC)
International Civil Aviation Organization (ICAO)
International Criminal Court (ICCt)
International Criminal Police Organization (Interpol)
International Development Association (IDA)
International Federation of Red Cross and Red Crescent Societies (IFRCS)
International Finance Corporation (IFC)
International Fund for Agricultural Development (IFAD)
International Hydrographic Organization (IHO)
International Labour Organization (ILO)
International Maritime Organization (IMO)
International Mobile Satellite Organization (IMSO)
International Monetary Fund (IMF)
International Olympic Committee (IOC)
International Organization for Migration (IOM)
International Organization for Standardization (ISO)
International Red Cross and Red Crescent Movement (ICRM)
International Telecommunication Union (ITU)
International Telecommunications Satellite Organization (ITSO)
International Trade Union Confederation (ITUC)
Inter-Parliamentary Union (IPU)
Multilateral Investment Guarantee Agency (MIGA)

Nonaligned Movement (NAM) (observer)
North Atlantic Treaty Organization (NATO)
Nuclear Suppliers Group (NSG)
Organisation internationale de la Francophonie (OIF) (observer)
Organization for Security and Cooperation in Europe (OSCE)
Organisation for the Prohibition of Chemical Weapons (OPCW)
Organization of American States (OAS) (observer)
Permanent Court of Arbitration (PCA)
Southeast European Cooperative Initiative (SECI)
United Nations (UN)
United Nations Conference on Trade and Development (UNCTAD)
United Nations Disengagement Observer Force (UNDOF)
United Nations Educational, Scientific, and Cultural Organization (UNESCO)
United Nations Industrial Development Organization (UNIDO)
United Nations Interim Force in Lebanon (UNIFIL)
United Nations Military Observer Group in India and Pakistan (UNMOGIP)
United Nations Mission for the Referendum in Western Sahara (MINURSO)
United Nations Mission in Liberia (UNMIL)
United Nations Mission in the Sudan (UNMIS)
United Nations Observer Mission in Georgia (UNOMIG)
United Nations Operation in Cote d'Ivoire (UNOCI)
United Nations Peacekeeping Force in Cyprus (UNFICYP)
United Nations Stabilization Mission in Haiti (MINUSTAH)
Universal Postal Union (UPU)
World Customs Organization (WCO)
World Federation of Trade Unions (WFTU)
World Health Organization (WHO)
World Intellectual Property Organization (WIPO)
World Meteorological Organization (WMO)
World Tourism Organization (UNWTO)
World Trade Organization (WTO)
World Veterans Federation (WVF)
Zangger Committee (ZC)

Law and order in Croatia 

Law of Croatia
 Capital punishment in Croatia
 Constitution of Croatia
 Crime in Croatia
 Human rights in Croatia
 LGBT rights in Croatia
 Freedom of religion in Croatia
 Law enforcement in Croatia

Military of Croatia 

Military of Croatia
 Command
 Commander-in-chief: President Zoran Milanović
 Ministry of Defence of Croatia: Minister Mario Banožić
 Chief of the General Staff: Admiral Robert Hranj
 Forces
 Army of Croatia
 Navy of Croatia
 Air Force of Croatia
 Special forces of Croatia
 Military history of Croatia
 Croatian military ranks

Local government in Croatia 

Local government in Croatia

History of Croatia 

 Military history of Croatia

Culture of Croatia 

Culture of Croatia

 Architecture of Croatia
 Cuisine of Croatia
 Ethnic minorities in Croatia
 Czechs in Croatia
 Germans of Croatia
 Roma in Croatia
 Serbs of Croatia
 Festivals in Croatia
 Languages of Croatia
 Media in Croatia
 Museums in Croatia
 National symbols of Croatia
 Coat of arms of Croatia
 Flag of Croatia
 National anthem of Croatia
 People of Croatia
 Prostitution in Croatia
 Public holidays in Croatia
 Records of Croatia
 Religion in Croatia
 Roman Catholicism in Croatia
 Buddhism in Croatia
 Hinduism in Croatia
 Islam in Croatia
 Judaism in Croatia
 Orthodoxy in Croatia
 Croatian Wine
 World Heritage Sites in Croatia

Art in Croatia 
 Art of Croatia
 Cinema of Croatia
 Literature in Croatia
 Music of Croatia
 Television in Croatia
 Theatre in Croatia

Sports in Croatia 

Sports in Croatia
 Football in Croatia
 Croatia national football team
Croatia at the FIFA World Cup
 Croatia at the Olympics
 2009 World Men's Handball Championship

Economy and infrastructure of Croatia 

Economy of Croatia
 Economic rank, by nominal GDP (2007): 64th (sixty-fourth)
 Agriculture in Croatia
 Banking in Croatia
 National Bank of Croatia
 Banks in Croatia
 Communications in Croatia
 Internet in Croatia
 Companies of Croatia
 Currency of Croatia: Kuna
ISO 4217: HRK
 Energy in Croatia
 Energy policy of Croatia
 Oil industry in Croatia
 Health care in Croatia
 Mining in Croatia
 Zagreb Stock Exchange
 Varaždin Stock Exchange (defunct)
 Tourism in Croatia
 Transportation in Croatia
 Airports in Croatia
 Rail transport in Croatia
 Roads in Croatia
 Highways in Croatia
 State routes in Croatia

Education in Croatia 

Education in Croatia
 List of schools in Croatia
 List of high schools in Croatia
 Institutions of higher education in Croatia
 University of Zagreb
 University of Split
 University of Rijeka
 University of Osijek
 University of Zadar
 University of Dubrovnik
 University of Pula
 See also 

Index of Croatia-related articles
List of Croatia-related topics
 Outline of Slavic history and culture
 List of Slavic studies journals

References

External links

 
 Croatian Homepage
 About Croatia
 Croatian National Tourist Board
 The Government of the Republic of Croatia
 
 Weather forecasts and weather info on Croatia

Croatia